Charles Franklin Evans (October 15, 1889 – September 2, 1916) was a Major League Baseball pitcher. He played two seasons with the Boston Doves from 1909 to 1910. Evans died of heart failure on September 2, 1916.

References

External links

Boston Doves players
1889 births
1916 deaths
Baseball players from Vermont
Major League Baseball pitchers
Hartford Senators players
Syracuse Stars (minor league baseball) players